Howell Park Golf Course is a public 18-hole golf course located in Howell Township, New Jersey (with a Farmingdale ZIP code). The course was designed by Frank Dwayne and opened in 1970.

External links 

Howell Park – GolfLink
Howell Park – Monmouth County Park System

Buildings and structures in Monmouth County, New Jersey
Golf clubs and courses in New Jersey
Howell Township, New Jersey
1970 establishments in New Jersey